Andrea Bianchimano (born 25 December 1996) is an Italian professional footballer who plays as a striker for  club Lucchese on loan from Viterbese.

Career

Early career
Bianchimano was born in the Lombardy town of Carate Brianza. He began his career at local side A.C. Biassono, before signing for Olginatese in 2014. After making just one appearance for the Serie D side, playing 54 minutes of a 2–2 draw with Pergolettese on 19 October 2014, Bianchimano was signed by Lombardy side and Serie A giants Milan.

Milan
Bianchimano played in the Milan youth teams, eventually making his way into the Primavera side. He made 15 appearances, scoring 3 goals. Milan felt that Bianchimano was developed enough to play at the professional level, and subsequently sent him on a one-year loan to newly-promoted Lega Pro side Reggina. The  striker made his debut for the Amaranto on 21 August 2016, playing the full 90 minutes of a 0–1 loss to Paganese in the Coppa Italia Lega Pro. His first goal for the club came in the second minute of injury time in the game against Catanzaro, rescuing a 1–1 draw after starting the game on the bench and only playing the last 10 minutes.

Perugia

Loan to Catanzaro
On 18 January 2019, he joined Serie C club Catanzaro on loan until the end of the 2018–19 season.

Viterbese
On 18 January 2022, he went to Serie C club Viterbese. On 24 August 2022, Bianchimano was loaned by Lucchese.

References

External links

1996 births
Living people
People from Carate Brianza
Sportspeople from the Province of Monza e Brianza
Footballers from Lombardy
Italian footballers
Association football forwards
Serie B players
Serie C players
Serie D players
U.S.D. Olginatese players
A.C. Milan players
Reggina 1914 players
A.C. Perugia Calcio players
U.S. Catanzaro 1929 players
U.S. Viterbese 1908 players
Lucchese 1905 players